Green Lantern: First Flight was a steel roller coaster formerly located at Six Flags Magic Mountain in Valencia, California, United States. The ZacSpin model from Intamin was the first of its kind in the US when it opened on July 1, 2011. Its debut allowed Magic Mountain to reclaim its status of having the most roller coasters in the world.

Green Lantern closed abruptly in 2017 and remained inactive until its removal in 2019. It was moved to La Ronde amusement park in Montreal, Quebec, Canada, where it was set to reopen as Vipère in 2020. As a result of extended closures and limited park operation due to the COVID-19 pandemic, Vipère's opening was indefinitely delayed. In 2022, La Ronde made the decision to cancel the coaster's installation.

History

Six Flags Magic Mountain (2011–2019)

On October 20, 2010, six days after a leaked video revealed plans for a new roller coaster at Six Flags Magic Mountain, Six Flags officially confirmed that Green Lantern: First Flight would open in spring of 2011. The new coaster, a ZacSpin model from Intamin, would be the first of its kind in the United States. According to the press release, it was scheduled to be built in a "newly themed section" of the park, later revealed as DC Universe in place of Gotham City Backlot. Reports surfaced in February 2011 that portions of track had arrived on site. The ride vehicles also arrived at the park during this time.

After delaying the ride's opening multiple times, Six Flags eventually settled on an opening date of July 1, 2011. Park officials clarified that the delays were due to unplanned design changes to the loading station and not because of mechanical issues. Primary construction was completed in May 2011. In addition to Green Lantern's premiere on July 1, other rides in the DC Universe themed area made their debut as well, including The Flash: Speed Force, and Wonder Woman: Lasso of Truth.

The coaster had a mechanical flaw where the trains would reportedly get stuck upside down. As a solution, Green Lantern received modifications to the trains to reduce the spinning. This, however, resulted in unnatural, painful and shaky movements which caused the ride to receive somewhat mixed reviews from those who experienced the coaster.

After the deadly incident on Inferno at Terra Mítica in Benidorm, Spain on July 7, 2014, and because the two rides share several similarities, Six Flags Magic Mountain had ceased running Green Lantern: First Flight pending investigation findings from the European park. A week and a half later, Six Flags Magic Mountain reopened the coaster.

La Ronde: cancelled opening

In July 2017, Green Lantern closed unexpectedly for unknown reasons. It remained inactive at the park, and in March 2019, Six Flags announced that Green Lantern would not be reopening. The coaster was removed later in the year and relocated to La Ronde in Montreal, where it was originally set to reopen as Vipère in 2020. Green Lantern's loading station left behind was reused in 2022 for its replacement roller coaster, Wonder Woman Flight of Courage.

Due to the growing impact of the COVID-19 pandemic, Six Flags suspended operations across the company on March 13, 2020. This included La Ronde's construction of Vipère. While the park resumed normal operations in August 2020, Vipère's construction remained on hold. Six Flags had begun taking steps to improve its financial standing by deferring capital projects during the pandemic. A park spokesperson stated that Vipère's debut was being pushed to the 2021 season.

In 2021, La Ronde extended the postponement indefinitely. The Vipère project was eventually cancelled in February 2022.

Ride

Riders flip head over heels several times throughout the ride in a somewhat uncontrolled manner, but due to the way the ride vehicles are loaded, it sometimes didn't flip at all. The ride has the same layout as Insane at Gröna Lund in Sweden.

Green Lantern was similar to X2, which is also a 4th Dimension roller coaster at Six Flags Magic Mountain that opened in 2002. The difference between the two roller coasters was based on the spinning or rotation of the vehicle. On Green Lantern, the rotation of the vehicle is controlled by the unequal gravitational pull on different sides of the rotational axis. This uncontrolled spinning results in a slightly different ride experience every time.

Theme
When located at Magic Mountain, Green Lantern: First Flight was themed to the DC Comics superhero, Green Lantern. Its opening was preceded by Green Lantern at Six Flags Great Adventure as well as the Green Lantern film. The ride's name also appears as a title for a DC Animated Universe film, Green Lantern: First Flight.

Each of the ride's five cars are themed to resemble shuriken. The entrance of the ride was marked by a -tall lantern icon that glowed green at night. The Green Lantern battery was located at the entrance of the ride.

References

La Ronde (amusement park)
Roller coasters in California
Roller coasters introduced in 2011
Amusement rides that closed in 2017
Roller coasters operated by Six Flags
Six Flags Magic Mountain
Former roller coasters in California
DC Comics in amusement parks
Green Lantern in other media